is a Māori language term that translates literally to 'highest chieftainship' or 'unqualified chieftainship', but is also translated as "self-determination", "sovereignty" and "absolute sovereignty".

It has become one of the most contentious phrases in retrospective analyses of the treaty amid debate surrounding the obligations that were agreed to by each signatory. The phrase features in current historical and political discourse on race relations in New Zealand and is widely used by Māori advocacy groups. 

A tino rangatiratanga flag was designed in 1989 and has become accepted as a national flag for Māori groups across New Zealand.

Origins and etymology 

A  is a chief, the nominalising suffix  makes the word an abstract noun referring to the quality or attributes of chieftainship. The word is also translated as 'chiefly autonomy', or 'kingdom', referencing the 'chiefly authority' and domain of the chief.

 is used as an intensifier, indicating that something is true, genuine or unrivalled. The addition in this context means the phrase can be translated as 'highest chieftainship'.

The intention of the phrase was to "emphasize to a chief the Queen's intention to give the complete control according to their customs". One English translation is 'absolute sovereignty', although many also refer to it as self-determination, autonomy, or Māori independence.

Treaty of Waitangi 
The emphasis on  draws from an inconsistency arising between Article 1 and Article 2 of the Treaty of Waitangi:

In the English text of Article 1 of the treaty, the Māori signatories cede their sovereignty to the British Crown. For the Māori text, since there was no direct Māori translation for the idea, the missionary neologism  ('governorship') was used to represent the concept of sovereignty.
In the English text of Article 2, signatories are assured that "the full exclusive and undisturbed possession of their Lands and Estates Forests Fisheries and other properties" would remain for so long as they chose. In the Māori text, signatories are assured that their  will remain undisturbed over their lands,  and other : "te tino rangatiratanga o ratou wenua o ratou kainga me o ratou taonga katoa", literally "the absolute chieftainship of your lands, your homes, and all your treasures/taonga".

Based on the Māori text alone, in Article 1, the signatories appear to be granting , and in Article 2, the signatories are promised that their  ('absolutely sovereignty' or 'highest chieftainship') would remain undisturbed. The apparent inconsistency led to much debate as to whether the Māori signatories intended to cede their sovereignty to the British Crown at all: a debate now definitively resolved by the Waitangi Tribunal ruling that sovereignty was not and could not be ceded.

Text of the Treaty 

The original Māori text of article two with a literal translation by Professor I. H. Kawharu, as published in the Report of the Royal Commission on Social Policy in 1988 (bold added):

Flag

The Tino Rangatiratanga flag is often referred to as the Māori flag and can be used to represent all Māori. Hiraina Marsden, Jan Smith and Linda Munn designed the flag in 1989. It uses black, white, and red as national colours of New Zealand. The design of the flag references the Māori creation story of Rangi and Papa, suggesting the sky, the earth, and the physical realm of light and being, which was created when they were separated.

See also 
 Māori protest movement
 United Tribes of New Zealand flag

Notes

References

External links
 Maori leaders clash over flag's new role at The New Zealand Herald

Constitution of New Zealand
Flags of indigenous peoples
Māori politics
Treaty of Waitangi
Māori words and phrases
Māori organisations
Māori flags